A CYP17A1 inhibitor is a type of drug which inhibits the enzyme CYP17A1. It may inhibit both of the functions of the enzyme, 17α-hydroxylase and 17,20-lyase, or may be selective for inhibition of one of these two functions (generally 17,20-lyase). These drugs prevent the conversion of pregnane steroids into androgens like testosterone and therefore are androgen biosynthesis inhibitors and functional antiandrogens. Examples of CYP17A1 inhibitors include the older drug ketoconazole and the newer drugs abiraterone acetate, orteronel, galeterone, and seviteronel. The CYP17A1 inhibitors that have been marketed, like abiraterone acetate, are used mainly in the treatment of prostate cancer. CYP17A1 inhibitors that are not selective for inhibition of 17,20-lyase must be combined with a glucocorticoid such as prednisone in order to avoid adrenal insufficiency and mineralocorticoid excess caused by prevention of cortisol production.

See also
 Steroidogenic enzyme
 Steroidogenesis inhibitor
 Nonsteroidal antiandrogen
 Gonadotropin-releasing hormone analogue

References

External links

Antiandrogens
 
Hormonal antineoplastic drugs